Port Latta is a locality in North West Tasmania, with a processing plant and port used to export iron ore from the Savage River mine.

Ore is transported from mine to port by a slurry pipeline, which is 85 km long and paralleled by Pipeline Road. After de-watering, the ore is loaded onto ships via conveyor belts. The capacity of the mine, pipeline and conveyor belt is about 2.4MTpa.

The mine and port opened in 1967, and was still operating in 2021 with an expected life of mine to 2035 as per their 2020 yearly report.

References 

Localities of Circular Head Council
Latta